The 1972 Taça de Portugal Final was the final match of the 1971–72 Taça de Portugal, the 32nd season of the Taça de Portugal, the premier Portuguese football cup competition organized by the Portuguese Football Federation (FPF). The match was played on 4 June 1972 at the Estádio Nacional in Oeiras, and opposed two Primeira Liga sides: Benfica and Sporting CP. Benfica defeated Sporting CP 3–2 to claim a fifteenth Taça de Portugal.

Match

Details

References

1972
Taca
S.L. Benfica matches
Sporting CP matches